Tusya, also spelled Tusiã, Tusian, Toussian and also known as Wín, is a language of Burkina Faso that is of uncertain affiliation within Niger-Congo. It may be a Gur language.

Dialects
There are two dialects.

Tir (North Tusian)
Win (South Tusian)

The northern and southern dialects have difficulty understanding each other.

The northern dialect is spoken to the north, east, and south of Orodara. The southern dialect is spoken in and around Toussiana.

Notes

Gur languages
Languages of Burkina Faso